The East Irondequoit Central School District is a public school district in New York State that serves approximately 3,600 students in the eastern half of the town of Irondequoit in Monroe County.  It has over 600 employees and an operating budget of $86,563,388.  The average class size is 23 (K-5) and 24 (6-12) students.  The student-teacher ratio is 13:1 (elementary) and 13:1 (middle-high school).  Mary E. Grow is the Superintendent of Schools.

History

Board of education
The Board of Education consists of 9 members who serve rotating 3-year terms. Elections are held each May for board members and to vote on the school district budget.

Board members for the 2017–2018 school year are:
Kimberly Kane, president  
Ronald Cooper, vice president
Idris Smith
Kimberly Lasher
Jeffrey Petrie
Richard Oxley
Gary Pawlak
Doreen Swan
Christy Lynch

Schools

Elementary schools
Helendale Road Primary School (K-2) - Principal: Sean D'Abreu
Ivan L. Green Primary School (K-2) - Principal: Lucas Hiley
Durand Eastman-Intermediate School (3-5) - Interim Principal: Timothy Roach
Laurelton-Pardee Intermediate School (3-5) - Principal: Meghan Bello

Middle school
East Irondequoit Middle School (6-8) - Interim Principal: Christina Sloane - Assistant Principals: James Vallone, Brian Kurdziel

High school
Eastridge High School (9-12) - Principal: Timothy Heaphy - Assistant Principals: Christopher Whipple, Sheri Webber, Sean Costello

Renovations
During the 2006–2007 school year, the Durand-Eastman Intermediate School was being renovated. Its students were being housed at Ivan Green School (grade 3), Bishop Kearney School (grade 4) and East Irondequoit Middle School (grade 5). Now that the renovation of Durand Eastman is over, the students have returned to their "New" school. Residents of East Irondequoit Central School District voted on Tuesday, December 9, 2008, to approve the Generational Capital Project that includes construction and renovation work and purchase of buses to begin a district transportation service.
There will be no tax increase for the proposed construction, however, increased taxes will be needed to pay for hiring teachers, bus drivers and maintenance for the new buses.  The new district-based transportation system will reduce costs by estimated $700,000 per year, on average, through reduced expenses and new revenue.
The project includes capital construction and renovation work and a district based transportation system.  The proposal includes major improvements to the athletic facilities at Eastridge High School, which are more than fifty years old, along with renovation work at district elementary schools.

References

External links

School districts in New York (state)
Education in Monroe County, New York
School districts established in 1956